Bayelsa Medical University (BMU) is located in Yenagoa, Bayelsa State in Nigeria.

Faculties 

 Faculty of Clinical Sciences
 Faculty of Health Sciences
 Faculty of Basic Medical Sciences
 Faculty of Sciences

Faculty of Clinical Sciences 

 Medicine and Surgery
 Dentistry

Faculty of Health Sciences 

 Nursing
 Optometry
 Physiotherapy
 Medical Laboratory Science
 Public Health
 Human Nutrition and Dietetics
 Community Health

Faculty of Basic Medical Sciences 

 Human Anatomy
 Human Physiology
 Biochemistry

Faculty of Sciences 

 Physics with electronics
 Chemistry
 Microbiology
 Biology
 Mathematic
 Statistics

See Also
Academic libraries in Nigeria

References

External links 
 Bayelsa Medical University Website

Universities and colleges in Nigeria
Medical schools in Nigeria
Bayelsa State
Public universities in Nigeria
Academic libraries in Nigeria